General Merritt may refer to:

Edwin Atkins Merritt (1828–1916), New York Militia brigadier general
Jack N. Merritt (1930–2018), U.S. Army four-star general
Jody Merritt (fl. 1980s–2020s), U.S. Air Force brigadier general
Lewie G. Merritt (1897–1974), U.S. Marine Corps major general
Wesley Merritt (1836–1910), U.S. Army major general